Francine Reed (born July 11, 1947 in Pembroke Township, Illinois, United States) is an American blues singer, solo artist, and regular singing partner of Lyle Lovett since the 1980s and member of Lovett's Large Band.   Reed has also recorded duets with Willie Nelson and Delbert McClinton and others.

Biography
Reed sang at church services in her youth and her music was inspired and influenced by her gospel-singing father. She is the sister of jazz singer Margo Reed who died in April 2015 at the age of 73.

In Phoenix, Arizona, Francine Reed appeared with Miles Davis, Stanley Jordan, Smokey Robinson, Etta James, and The Crusaders. In 1985, she began recording and touring with Lyle Lovett and His Large Band. Reed has also appeared on recordings by Delbert McClinton, Willie Nelson and Roy Orbison.  After she relocated to Georgia in the 1990s, she released her first solo album, I Want You to Love Me. Reed has received the W. C. Handy Artist of the Year and Song of the Year nominations. (The W. C. Handy awards were renamed the Blues Music Awards in 2006). Reed was inducted into the Arizona Blues Hall of Fame in 1997.

Reed is perhaps best known for her performances of the classic blues song "Wild Women (Don't Get the Blues)," written in 1924 by Ida Cox. A recording of this song appears on Reed's albums, I Want You to Love Me, I Got a Right!...to Some of My Best, and Blues Collection; as well as on Ichiban Records Wild Women Do Get the Blues and Lyle Lovett's Live in Texas.

Reed's distinctive voice can be heard on a television advertisement for Senokot laxative ("I Feel Good"), and in a scene from the film The Firm (1993).

In the mid-1990s she moved to Atlanta, Georgia, where she frequently performed at Blind Willie's in the Virginia-Highland neighborhood.
In 2016 she moved to back to Phoenix and has given up touring.

Partial discography

TV and film

References

External links
FrancineReed.net
Arizona Blues Hall of Fame Website
 "Francine Reed", New Georgia Encyclopedia Website
 Blues Music Awards

1947 births
Living people
People from Kankakee County, Illinois
American blues singers
Musicians from Atlanta
Singers from Chicago
Singers from Arizona
21st-century African-American women singers
20th-century African-American women singers
Lyle Lovett and His Large Band members